Dilekli is a village in the Yüksekova District of Hakkâri Province in Turkey close to the border to Iraq. The village is populated by Kurds of the Oramar tribe and had a population of 4 in 2022.

The unpopulated hamlet of Dibecik is attached to Dilekli. The two unpopulated settlements of Pirinçeken and Mezruk can also be found south of the village. Pirinçeken was also an Oramar village.

Population 
Population history from 1965 to 2022:

References 

Villages in Yüksekova District
Kurdish settlements in Hakkâri Province